The Jenks–Union football rivalry, is an American high school football rivalry game played annually between the Trojans of Jenks High School and Union High School in Tulsa.

History
The Backyard Bowl regular season football games are usually played at Skelly Field at H. A. Chapman Stadium at the University of Tulsa. Known as the "Backyard Bowl,"  the rivalry has received coverage by Sporting News and is the subject of a Versus documentary produced by NFL Films. The annual game is played at the University of Tulsa and has drawn crowds of over 40,000. The annual rivalry game was presented on the Great American Rivalry Series internet broadcast in 2007.  One of these two teams won Oklahoma's Class 6A (large school) title every year from 1996 to 2016.

Notable games

1999
Class 6A State Championship: Jenks 14 – Union 7

The 1999 Class 6A State Championship featured archrivals Jenks against Union, in the regular-season game, Union was victorious by a score of 27–24 in overtime. The game was the second championship tilt between the Trojan and Redskins. In 1998, Jenks beat Union 41–38. In front of a record-setting crowd of 40,385 for Oklahoma high school football, Jenks was victorious by a score of 14–7, winning their four consecutive and seventh overall State championship.

Game results

Notable alumni

Jenks
Chase Beeler, former center for the San Francisco 49ers and Philadelphia Eagles
Corey Callens, former DE for the Baltimore Ravens, Carolina Panthers, Rhein Fire, Miami Dolphins, and Austin Wranglers
Rocky Calmus, former Linebacker for the Tennessee Titans (2002–2004)  
Phillip Dillard, former LB for the New York Giants, Carolina Panthers, Omaha Nighthawks, and San Diego Chargers
Jake Laptad, former DE for the Chicago Bears
Sean Mahan, former NFL center for the Tampa Bay Buccaneers  
Garrett Mills, former TE for the New England Patriots, Minnesota Vikings, Philadelphia Eagles, and Cincinnati Bengals
Anthony Phillips, former DE for the Chicago Bears
Lawrence Pinson, former LB for the Arizona Cardinals, Amsterdam Admirals, and New York Jets
Brian Presley is an American actor
Sean Wells, former lineman for the Houston Oilers
Jerry Wisne, former OT for the Chicago Bears, Minnesota Vikings, St. Louis Rams, and Green Bay Packers
Steven Parker, Defensive Back for the Dallas Cowboys
Dillon Stoner, Wide Receiver for the Oakland Raiders
Tyler Ott, Longsnapper for the Seattle Seahawks
Darwin Thompson, Runningback for the Tampa Bay Buccaneers

Union
Justin Fuente, former Oklahoma Sooners quarterback and head football coach for Virginia Tech
Jeff Leiding, football linebacker for the Indianapolis Colts, 1986–1987
Steve Logan, former East Carolina head football coach 1992–2002 and Boston College offensive coordinator 2007–2009 (Assistant coach at Union High, 1974–79).
Dominique Franks, football cornerback for the Atlanta Falcons, 2010–present
Tress Way, football punter for the Washington Redskins, 2013–present

References

External links
 
 

American football in Oklahoma
High school football games in the United States